Frank Ward (3 June 1888 – 1 March 1952) was an English first-class cricketer and British Army soldier.

Ward made four appearances in first-class cricket for the British Army cricket team, debuting against Oxford University at Oxford in 1926, with Ward making further first-class appearance in the same season against Cambridge University at Fenner's. He made two further first-class appearances for the Army in 1927, against the Royal Navy and the touring New Zealanders. In his four first-class appearances, he scored a total of 28 runs, while with the ball he took 2 wickets.

He died at Worthing in March 1952.

References

External links

1888 births
1952 deaths
Sportspeople from Kensington
British Army soldiers
British Army personnel of World War I
English cricketers
British Army cricketers
Military personnel from Middlesex